Hosur Aerodrome is an airport located at Belagondapalli 10 Kilometres southwest of Hosur, Tamil Nadu, India.

The airfield is owned by Taneja aerospace and aviation Limited (TAAL), established in 1994 as the first private sector company to manufacture General Aviation aircraft in India. TAAL uses the airfield for its Aircraft Manufacturing, Sales and MRO businesses. This aerodrome is approved and licensed by the Directorate General of Civil Aviation under private use category. The aerodrome complex also houses MRO facilities of Air Works India 
and widebody aircraft painting facilities of Air Livery.
Many Indian carriers notably SpiceJet, GoAir and Vistara send their aircraft to Hosur for 'C' checks pand 1200 hours inspections by Air Works Ltd., and for painting done by Air Livery.

Structure
Hosur Aerodrome has one asphalt runway, oriented 09/27, 7012 feet long and 150 feet wide, capable of accepting Airbus A-320 and Boeing 737 aircraft and has night landing facilities which are pending approval. At the moment, the airfield is purely VFR lying in the local flying area of HAL Bangalore Airport;  approach control to aircraft is provided by HAL ATC and terminal advisory control is provided by Hosur Tower.

Navigational aids at Hosur include PAPI lights and an Aerodrome beacon. It has aprons measuring 110 × 90 and 110 × 80 metres for jet aircraft and another one measuring 40 × 19 metres for Turboprop and light aircraft.

References

External links
 
 Article in Deccan Herald
 DGCA Website Link for Status of Aerodrome

Airports in Tamil Nadu
Krishnagiri district
Airports with year of establishment missing